Paracladopelma is a genus of Palearctic and Nearctic non-biting midges in the subfamily Chironominae of the bloodworm family Chironomidae.

Species
P. alphaeus (Sublette, 1960)
P. camptolabis (Kieffer, 1913)
P. doris (Townes, 1945)
P. galaptera (Townes, 1945)
P. laminatum (Kieffer, 1921)
P. loganae Beck & Beck, 1969
P. mikianum (Goetghebuer, 1937)
P. nais (Townes, 1945)
P. nereis (Townes, 1945)
P. nigritulum (Goetghebuer, 1942)
P. nixe (Townes, 1945)
P. undine (Townes, 1945)
P. winnelli Jackson, 1977

References

Chironomidae
Diptera of Europe